Finbarr Gantley (1 September 1950 – 16 July 2021) was an Irish hurler who played for a number of club sides, including St. Gabriel's and Beagh. He also lined out at inter-county level with the Warwickshire, London and Galway senior hurling teams.

Career

Born near Shanaglish on the Clare-Galway border, Gantley had an uncle, Paddy Gantley, who had played with the Galway senior hurling team in the 1940s and is regarded as one of their greatest ever players. After emigrating to the UK at the age of 16, Gantley won County Championship titles with the Brothers Pearse and St. Gabriel's clubs. He also lined out with Warwickshire and London, losing five All-Ireland finals across the junior, intermediate and senior B grades. After returning to Ireland Gantley joined the Beagh club and was drafted onto the Galway senior team. He lined out in three successive All-Ireland finals, coming on as a substitute for Galway's 1980 All-Ireland final defeat of Limerick.

Personal life and death

Gantley's sons Finbarr Jnr and Rory also hurled for the Galway senior team in the 1990s and 2000s. He died in Tubber, County Galway on 16 July 2021.

Honours

Brothers Pearse
London Senior Hurling Championship: 1968, 1972

St Gabriel's
London Senior Hurling Championship: 1973, 1974, 1976, 1977

Beagh
Galway Intermediate Hurling Championship: 1980

Galway
 All-Ireland Senior Hurling Championship: 1980

References

1950 births
2021 deaths
Beagh hurlers
London inter-county hurlers
Galway inter-county hurlers
Connacht inter-provincial hurlers
All-Ireland Senior Hurling Championship winners